Coryphopterus urospilus, the redlight goby, is a species of goby found in the Eastern Central Pacific Ocean.  

References

Gobiidae
Fish of the Atlantic Ocean
Fish described in 1938
Taxa named by Isaac Ginsburg